Cummer may refer to:

Cummer, County Galway, a civil parish in Ireland
Anna Cummer (born 1977), Canadian actress
Ninah Cummer, namesake of the Cummer Museum of Art and Gardens in Florida, United States

See also
Kummer (surname)
Comer (disambiguation)